Gattis is a surname and it may refer to:

 Dan Gattis (born 1967), American politician
 Evan Gattis (born 1986), American baseball player
 Josh Gattis (born 1984), American football player
 Keith Gattis (born 1970), American country music artist
 Lynn Gattis (born 1957), American politician

See also
 Gatti's, a Southeastern United States pizza-buffet chain
 Mark Gatiss, an English actor and writer